A nuclear weapon is an explosive device that derives its destructive force from nuclear reactions, either fission (fission bomb) or a combination of fission and fusion reactions (thermonuclear bomb), producing a nuclear explosion. Both bomb types release large quantities of energy from relatively small amounts of matter.

Nuclear bombs have had yields between 10 tons TNT (the W54) and 50 megatons for the Tsar Bomba (see TNT equivalent).

A nuclear device no larger than a conventional bomb can devastate an entire city by blast, fire, and radiation. Since they are weapons of mass destruction, the proliferation of nuclear weapons is a focus of international relations policy. Nuclear weapons have been deployed twice in war, by the United States against the Japanese cities of Hiroshima and Nagasaki in 1945 during World War II.

Testing and deployment 
Nuclear weapons have only twice been used in war, both times by the United States against Japan near the end of World War II. On August 6, 1945, the U.S. Army Air Forces detonated a uranium gun-type fission bomb nicknamed "Little Boy" over the Japanese city of Hiroshima; three days later, on August 9, the U.S. Army Air Forces detonated a plutonium implosion-type fission bomb nicknamed "Fat Man" over the Japanese city of Nagasaki. These bombings caused injuries that resulted in the deaths of approximately 200,000 civilians and military personnel. The ethics of these bombings and their role in Japan's surrender are subjects of debate.

Since the atomic bombings of Hiroshima and Nagasaki, nuclear weapons have been detonated over 2,000 times for testing and demonstration. Only a few nations possess such weapons or are suspected of seeking them. The only countries known to have detonated nuclear weapons—and acknowledge possessing them—are (chronologically by date of first test) the United States, the Soviet Union (succeeded as a nuclear power by Russia), the United Kingdom, France, China, India, Pakistan, and North Korea. Israel is believed to possess nuclear weapons, though, in a policy of deliberate ambiguity, it does not acknowledge having them. Germany, Italy, Turkey, Belgium and the Netherlands are nuclear weapons sharing states. South Africa is the only country to have independently developed and then renounced and dismantled its nuclear weapons.

The Treaty on the Non-Proliferation of Nuclear Weapons aims to reduce the spread of nuclear weapons, but its effectiveness has been questioned. Modernisation of weapons continues to this day.

Types 

There are two basic types of nuclear weapons: those that derive the majority of their energy from nuclear fission reactions alone, and those that use fission reactions to begin nuclear fusion reactions that produce a large amount of the total energy output.

Fission weapons 

All existing nuclear weapons derive some of their explosive energy from nuclear fission reactions. Weapons whose explosive output is exclusively from fission reactions are commonly referred to as atomic bombs or atom bombs (abbreviated as A-bombs). This has long been noted as something of a misnomer, as their energy comes from the nucleus of the atom, just as it does with fusion weapons.

In fission weapons, a mass of fissile material (enriched uranium or plutonium) is forced into supercriticality—allowing an exponential growth of nuclear chain reactions—either by shooting one piece of sub-critical material into another (the "gun" method) or by compression of a sub-critical sphere or cylinder of fissile material using chemically fueled explosive lenses. The latter approach, the "implosion" method, is more sophisticated and more efficient (smaller, less massive, and requiring less of the expensive fissile fuel) than the former.

A major challenge in all nuclear weapon designs is to ensure that a significant fraction of the fuel is consumed before the weapon destroys itself. The amount of energy released by fission bombs can range from the equivalent of just under a ton to upwards of 500,000 tons (500 kilotons) of TNT.

All fission reactions generate fission products, the remains of the split atomic nuclei. Many fission products are either highly radioactive (but short-lived) or moderately radioactive (but long-lived), and as such, they are a serious form of radioactive contamination. Fission products are the principal radioactive component of nuclear fallout. Another source of radioactivity is the burst of free neutrons produced by the weapon. When they collide with other nuclei in the surrounding material, the neutrons transmute those nuclei into other isotopes, altering their stability and making them radioactive.

The most commonly used fissile materials for nuclear weapons applications have been uranium-235 and plutonium-239. Less commonly used has been uranium-233. Neptunium-237 and some isotopes of americium may be usable for nuclear explosives as well, but it is not clear that this has ever been implemented, and their plausible use in nuclear weapons is a matter of dispute.

Fusion weapons 

The other basic type of nuclear weapon produces a large proportion of its energy in nuclear fusion reactions. Such fusion weapons are generally referred to as thermonuclear weapons or more colloquially as hydrogen bombs (abbreviated as H-bombs), as they rely on fusion reactions between isotopes of hydrogen (deuterium and tritium). All such weapons derive a significant portion of their energy from fission reactions used to "trigger" fusion reactions, and fusion reactions can themselves trigger additional fission reactions.

Only six countries—United States, Russia, United Kingdom, China, France, and India—have conducted thermonuclear weapon tests. Whether India has detonated a "true" multi-staged thermonuclear weapon is controversial. North Korea claims to have tested a fusion weapon , though this claim is disputed. Thermonuclear weapons are considered much more difficult to successfully design and execute than primitive fission weapons. Almost all of the nuclear weapons deployed today use the thermonuclear design because it is more efficient.

Thermonuclear bombs work by using the energy of a fission bomb to compress and heat fusion fuel. In the Teller-Ulam design, which accounts for all multi-megaton yield hydrogen bombs, this is accomplished by placing a fission bomb and fusion fuel (tritium, deuterium, or lithium deuteride) in proximity within a special, radiation-reflecting container. When the fission bomb is detonated, gamma rays and X-rays emitted first compress the fusion fuel, then heat it to thermonuclear temperatures. The ensuing fusion reaction creates enormous numbers of high-speed neutrons, which can then induce fission in materials not normally prone to it, such as depleted uranium. Each of these components is known as a "stage", with the fission bomb as the "primary" and the fusion capsule as the "secondary". In large, megaton-range hydrogen bombs, about half of the yield comes from the final fissioning of depleted uranium.

Virtually all thermonuclear weapons deployed today use the "two-stage" design described above, but it is possible to add additional fusion stages—each stage igniting a larger amount of fusion fuel in the next stage. This technique can be used to construct thermonuclear weapons of arbitrarily large yield. This is in contrast to fission bombs, which are limited in their explosive power due to criticality danger (premature nuclear chain reaction caused by too-large amounts of pre-assembled fissile fuel). Most thermonuclear weapons are considerably smaller than this, due to practical constraints from missile warhead space and weight requirements.

Fusion reactions do not create fission products, and thus contribute far less to the creation of nuclear fallout than fission reactions, but because all thermonuclear weapons contain at least one fission stage, and many high-yield thermonuclear devices have a final fission stage, thermonuclear weapons can generate at least as much nuclear fallout as fission-only weapons. Furthermore, high yield thermonuclear explosions (most dangerously ground bursts) have the force to lift radioactive debris upwards past the tropopause into the stratosphere, where the calm non-turbulent winds permit the debris to travel great distances from the burst, eventually settling and unpredictably contaminating areas far removed from the target of the explosion.

Other types 

There are other types of nuclear weapons as well. For example, a boosted fission weapon is a fission bomb that increases its explosive yield through a small number of fusion reactions, but it is not a fusion bomb. In the boosted bomb, the neutrons produced by the fusion reactions serve primarily to increase the efficiency of the fission bomb. There are two types of boosted fission bomb: internally boosted, in which a deuterium-tritium mixture is injected into the bomb core, and externally boosted, in which concentric shells of lithium-deuteride and depleted uranium are layered on the outside of the fission bomb core. The external method of boosting enabled the USSR to field the first partially-thermonuclear weapons, but it is now obsolete because it demands a spherical bomb geometry, which was adequate during the 1950s arms race when bomber aircraft were the only available delivery vehicles.

The detonation of any nuclear weapon is accompanied by a blast of neutron radiation. Surrounding a nuclear weapon with suitable materials (such as cobalt or gold) creates a weapon known as a salted bomb. This device can produce exceptionally large quantities of long-lived radioactive contamination. It has been conjectured that such a device could serve as a "doomsday weapon" because such a large quantity of radioactivities with half-lives of decades, lifted into the stratosphere where winds would distribute it around the globe, would make all life on the planet extinct.

In connection with the Strategic Defense Initiative, research into the nuclear pumped laser was conducted under the DOD program Project Excalibur but this did not result in a working weapon. The concept involves the tapping of the energy of an exploding nuclear bomb to power a single-shot laser that is directed at a distant target.

During the Starfish Prime high-altitude nuclear test in 1962, an unexpected effect was produced which is called a nuclear electromagnetic pulse. This is an intense flash of electromagnetic energy produced by a rain of high-energy electrons which in turn are produced by a nuclear bomb's gamma rays. This flash of energy can permanently destroy or disrupt electronic equipment if insufficiently shielded. It has been proposed to use this effect to disable an enemy's military and civilian infrastructure as an adjunct to other nuclear or conventional military operations. By itself it could as well be useful to terrorists for crippling a nation's economic electronics-based infrastructure. Because the effect is most effectively produced by high altitude nuclear detonations (by military weapons delivered by air, though ground bursts also produce EMP effects over a localized area), it can produce damage to electronics over a wide, even continental, geographical area.

Research has been done into the possibility of pure fusion bombs: nuclear weapons that consist of fusion reactions without requiring a fission bomb to initiate them. Such a device might provide a simpler path to thermonuclear weapons than one that required the development of fission weapons first, and pure fusion weapons would create significantly less nuclear fallout than other thermonuclear weapons because they would not disperse fission products. In 1998, the United States Department of Energy divulged that the United States had, "...made a substantial investment" in the past to develop pure fusion weapons, but that, "The U.S. does not have and is not developing a pure fusion weapon", and that, "No credible design for a pure fusion weapon resulted from the DOE investment".

Nuclear isomers provide a possible pathway to fissionless fusion bombs. These are naturally occurring isotopes (178m2Hf being a prominent example) which exist in an elevated energy state. Mechanisms to release this energy as bursts of gamma radiation (as in the hafnium controversy) have been proposed as possible triggers for conventional thermonuclear reactions.

Antimatter, which consists of particles resembling ordinary matter particles in most of their properties but having opposite electric charge, has been considered as a trigger mechanism for nuclear weapons. A major obstacle is the difficulty of producing antimatter in large enough quantities, and there is no evidence that it is feasible beyond the military domain. However, the U.S. Air Force funded studies of the physics of antimatter in the Cold War, and began considering its possible use in weapons, not just as a trigger, but as the explosive itself. A fourth generation nuclear weapon design is related to, and relies upon, the same principle as antimatter-catalyzed nuclear pulse propulsion.

Most variation in nuclear weapon design is for the purpose of achieving different yields for different situations, and in manipulating design elements to attempt to minimize weapon size, radiation hardness or requirements for special materials, especially fissile fuel or tritium.

Tactical nuclear weapons

Some nuclear weapons are designed for special purposes; most of these are for non-strategic (decisively war-winning) purposes and are referred to as tactical nuclear weapons.

The neutron bomb purportedly conceived by Sam Cohen is a thermonuclear weapon that yields a relatively small explosion but a relatively large amount of neutron radiation. Such a weapon could, according to tacticians, be used to cause massive biological casualties while leaving inanimate infrastructure mostly intact and creating minimal fallout. Because high energy neutrons are capable of penetrating dense matter, such as tank armor, neutron warheads were procured in the 1980s (though not deployed in Europe, as intended, over the objections of NATO allies) for use as tactical payloads for US Army artillery shells (200 mm W79 and 155 mm W82) and short range missile forces. Soviet authorities announced similar intentions for neutron warhead deployment in Europe; indeed claimed to have originally invented the neutron bomb, but their deployment on USSR tactical nuclear forces is unverifiable.

A type of nuclear explosive most suitable for use by ground special forces was the Special Atomic Demolition Munition, or SADM, sometimes popularly known as a suitcase nuke. This is a nuclear bomb that is man-portable, or at least truck-portable, and though of a relatively small yield (one or two kilotons) is sufficient to destroy important tactical targets such as bridges, dams, tunnels, important military or commercial installations, etc. either behind enemy lines or pre-emptively on friendly territory soon to be overtaken by invading enemy forces. These weapons require plutonium fuel and are particularly "dirty". Obviously they also demand especially stringent security precautions in their storage and deployment.

Small "tactical" nuclear weapons were deployed for use as antiaircraft weapons. Examples include the USAF AIR-2 Genie, the AIM-26 Falcon and US Army Nike Hercules. Missile interceptors such as the Sprint and the Spartan also used small nuclear warheads (optimized to produce neutron or X-ray flux) but were for use against enemy strategic warheads.

Other small, or tactical, nuclear weapons were deployed by naval forces for use primarily as antisubmarine weapons. These included nuclear depth bombs or nuclear armed torpedoes. Nuclear mines for use on land or at sea are also possibilities.

Weapons delivery 

The system used to deliver a nuclear weapon to its target is an important factor affecting both nuclear weapon design and nuclear strategy. The design, development, and maintenance of delivery systems are among the most expensive parts of a nuclear weapons program; they account, for example, for 57% of the financial resources spent by the United States on nuclear weapons projects since 1940.

The simplest method for delivering a nuclear weapon is a gravity bomb dropped from aircraft; this was the method used by the United States against Japan. This method places few restrictions on the size of the weapon. It does, however, limit attack range, response time to an impending attack, and the number of weapons that a country can field at the same time. With miniaturization, nuclear bombs can be delivered by both strategic bombers and tactical fighter-bombers. This method is the primary means of nuclear weapons delivery; the majority of U.S. nuclear warheads, for example, are free-fall gravity bombs, namely the B61.

Preferable from a strategic point of view is a nuclear weapon mounted on a missile, which can use a ballistic trajectory to deliver the warhead over the horizon. Although even short-range missiles allow for a faster and less vulnerable attack, the development of long-range intercontinental ballistic missiles (ICBMs) and submarine-launched ballistic missiles (SLBMs) has given some nations the ability to plausibly deliver missiles anywhere on the globe with a high likelihood of success.

More advanced systems, such as multiple independently targetable reentry vehicles (MIRVs), can launch multiple warheads at different targets from one missile, reducing the chance of a successful missile defense. Today, missiles are most common among systems designed for delivery of nuclear weapons. Making a warhead small enough to fit onto a missile, though, can be difficult.

Tactical weapons have involved the most variety of delivery types, including not only gravity bombs and missiles but also artillery shells, land mines, and nuclear depth charges and torpedoes for anti-submarine warfare. An atomic mortar has been tested by the United States. Small, two-man portable tactical weapons (somewhat misleadingly referred to as suitcase bombs), such as the Special Atomic Demolition Munition, have been developed, although the difficulty of combining sufficient yield with portability limits their military utility.

Nuclear strategy 

Nuclear warfare strategy is a set of policies that deal with preventing or fighting a nuclear war. The policy of trying to prevent an attack by a nuclear weapon from another country by threatening nuclear retaliation is known as the strategy of nuclear deterrence. The goal in deterrence is to always maintain a second strike capability (the ability of a country to respond to a nuclear attack with one of its own) and potentially to strive for first strike status (the ability to destroy an enemy's nuclear forces before they could retaliate). During the Cold War, policy and military theorists considered the sorts of policies that might prevent a nuclear attack, and they developed game theory models that could lead to stable deterrence conditions.

Different forms of nuclear weapons delivery (see above) allow for different types of nuclear strategies. The goals of any strategy are generally to make it difficult for an enemy to launch a pre-emptive strike against the weapon system and difficult to defend against the delivery of the weapon during a potential conflict. This can mean keeping weapon locations hidden, such as deploying them on submarines or land mobile transporter erector launchers whose locations are difficult to track, or it can mean protecting weapons by burying them in hardened missile silo bunkers. Other components of nuclear strategies included using missile defenses to destroy the missiles before they land, or implementing civil defense measures using early-warning systems to evacuate citizens to safe areas before an attack.

Weapons designed to threaten large populations or to deter attacks are known as strategic weapons. Nuclear weapons for use on a battlefield in military situations are called tactical weapons.

Critics of nuclear war strategy often suggest that a nuclear war between two nations would result in mutual annihilation. From this point of view, the significance of nuclear weapons is to deter war because any nuclear war would escalate out of mutual distrust and fear, resulting in mutually assured destruction. This threat of national, if not global, destruction has been a strong motivation for anti-nuclear weapons activism.

Critics from the peace movement and within the military establishment have questioned the usefulness of such weapons in the current military climate. According to an advisory opinion issued by the International Court of Justice in 1996, the use of (or threat of use of) such weapons would generally be contrary to the rules of international law applicable in armed conflict, but the court did not reach an opinion as to whether or not the threat or use would be lawful in specific extreme circumstances such as if the survival of the state were at stake.

Another deterrence position is that nuclear proliferation can be desirable. In this case, it is argued that, unlike conventional weapons, nuclear weapons deter all-out war between states, and they succeeded in doing this during the Cold War between the U.S. and the Soviet Union. In the late 1950s and early 1960s, Gen. Pierre Marie Gallois of France, an adviser to Charles de Gaulle, argued in books like The Balance of Terror: Strategy for the Nuclear Age (1961) that mere possession of a nuclear arsenal was enough to ensure deterrence, and thus concluded that the spread of nuclear weapons could increase international stability. Some prominent neo-realist scholars, such as Kenneth Waltz and John Mearsheimer, have argued, along the lines of Gallois, that some forms of nuclear proliferation would decrease the likelihood of total war, especially in troubled regions of the world where there exists a single nuclear-weapon state. Aside from the public opinion that opposes proliferation in any form, there are two schools of thought on the matter: those, like Mearsheimer, who favored selective proliferation, and Waltz, who was somewhat more non-interventionist. Interest in proliferation and the stability-instability paradox that it generates continues to this day, with ongoing debate about indigenous Japanese and South Korean nuclear deterrent against North Korea.

The threat of potentially suicidal terrorists possessing nuclear weapons (a form of nuclear terrorism) complicates the decision process. The prospect of mutually assured destruction might not deter an enemy who expects to die in the confrontation. Further, if the initial act is from a stateless terrorist instead of a sovereign nation, there might not be a nation or specific target to retaliate against. It has been argued, especially after the September 11, 2001, attacks, that this complication calls for a new nuclear strategy, one that is distinct from that which gave relative stability during the Cold War. Since 1996, the United States has had a policy of allowing the targeting of its nuclear weapons at terrorists armed with weapons of mass destruction.

Robert Gallucci argues that although traditional deterrence is not an effective approach toward terrorist groups bent on causing a nuclear catastrophe, Gallucci believes that "the United States should instead consider a policy of expanded deterrence, which focuses not solely on the would-be nuclear terrorists but on those states that may deliberately transfer or inadvertently leak nuclear weapons and materials to them. By threatening retaliation against those states, the United States may be able to deter that which it cannot physically prevent.".

Graham Allison makes a similar case, arguing that the key to expanded deterrence is coming up with ways of tracing nuclear material to the country that forged the fissile material. "After a nuclear bomb detonates, nuclear forensics cops would collect debris samples and send them to a laboratory for radiological analysis. By identifying unique attributes of the fissile material, including its impurities and contaminants, one could trace the path back to its origin." The process is analogous to identifying a criminal by fingerprints. "The goal would be twofold: first, to deter leaders of nuclear states from selling weapons to terrorists by holding them accountable for any use of their weapons; second, to give leaders every incentive to tightly secure their nuclear weapons and materials."

According to the Pentagon's June 2019 "Doctrine for Joint Nuclear Operations" of the Joint Chiefs of Staffs website Publication, "Integration of nuclear weapons employment with conventional and special operations forces is essential to the success of any mission or operation."

Governance, control, and law 

Because they are weapons of mass destruction, the proliferation and possible use of nuclear weapons are important issues in international relations and diplomacy. In most countries, the use of nuclear force can only be authorized by the head of government or head of state. Despite controls and regulations governing nuclear weapons, there is an inherent danger of "accidents, mistakes, false alarms, blackmail, theft, and sabotage".

In the late 1940s, lack of mutual trust prevented the United States and the Soviet Union from making progress on arms control agreements. The Russell–Einstein Manifesto was issued in London on July 9, 1955, by Bertrand Russell in the midst of the Cold War. It highlighted the dangers posed by nuclear weapons and called for world leaders to seek peaceful resolutions to international conflict. The signatories included eleven pre-eminent intellectuals and scientists, including Albert Einstein, who signed it just days before his death on April 18, 1955. A few days after the release, philanthropist Cyrus S. Eaton offered to sponsor a conference—called for in the manifesto—in Pugwash, Nova Scotia, Eaton's birthplace. This conference was to be the first of the Pugwash Conferences on Science and World Affairs, held in July 1957.

By the 1960s, steps were taken to limit both the proliferation of nuclear weapons to other countries and the environmental effects of nuclear testing. The Partial Nuclear Test Ban Treaty (1963) restricted all nuclear testing to underground nuclear testing, to prevent contamination from nuclear fallout, whereas the Treaty on the Non-Proliferation of Nuclear Weapons (1968) attempted to place restrictions on the types of activities signatories could participate in, with the goal of allowing the transference of non-military nuclear technology to member countries without fear of proliferation.

In 1957, the International Atomic Energy Agency (IAEA) was established under the mandate of the United Nations to encourage development of peaceful applications of nuclear technology, provide international safeguards against its misuse, and facilitate the application of safety measures in its use. In 1996, many nations signed the Comprehensive Nuclear-Test-Ban Treaty, which prohibits all testing of nuclear weapons. A testing ban imposes a significant hindrance to nuclear arms development by any complying country.

Additional treaties and agreements have governed nuclear weapons stockpiles between the countries with the two largest stockpiles, the United States and the Soviet Union, and later between the United States and Russia. These include treaties such as SALT II (never ratified), START I (expired), INF, START II (never in effect), SORT, and New START, as well as non-binding agreements such as SALT I and the Presidential Nuclear Initiatives of 1991. Even when they did not enter into force, these agreements helped limit and later reduce the numbers and types of nuclear weapons between the United States and the Soviet Union/Russia.

Nuclear weapons have also been opposed by agreements between countries. Many nations have been declared Nuclear-Weapon-Free Zones, areas where nuclear weapons production and deployment are prohibited, through the use of treaties. The Treaty of Tlatelolco (1967) prohibited any production or deployment of nuclear weapons in Latin America and the Caribbean, and the Treaty of Pelindaba (1964) prohibits nuclear weapons in many African countries. As recently as 2006 a Central Asian Nuclear Weapon Free Zone was established among the former Soviet republics of Central Asia prohibiting nuclear weapons.

In 1996, the International Court of Justice, the highest court of the United Nations, issued an Advisory Opinion concerned with the "Legality of the Threat or Use of Nuclear Weapons". The court ruled that the use or threat of use of nuclear weapons would violate various articles of international law, including the Geneva Conventions, the Hague Conventions, the UN Charter, and the Universal Declaration of Human Rights. Given the unique, destructive characteristics of nuclear weapons, the International Committee of the Red Cross calls on States to ensure that these weapons are never used, irrespective of whether they consider them lawful or not.

Additionally, there have been other, specific actions meant to discourage countries from developing nuclear arms. In the wake of the tests by India and Pakistan in 1998, economic sanctions were (temporarily) levied against both countries, though neither were signatories with the Nuclear Non-Proliferation Treaty. One of the stated casus belli for the initiation of the 2003 Iraq War was an accusation by the United States that Iraq was actively pursuing nuclear arms (though this was soon discovered not to be the case as the program had been discontinued). In 1981, Israel had bombed a nuclear reactor being constructed in Osirak, Iraq, in what it called an attempt to halt Iraq's previous nuclear arms ambitions; in 2007, Israel bombed another reactor being constructed in Syria.

In 2013, Mark Diesendorf said that governments of France, India, North Korea, Pakistan, UK, and South Africa have used nuclear power and/or research reactors to assist nuclear weapons development or to contribute to their supplies of nuclear explosives from military reactors.

The two tied-for-lowest points for the Doomsday Clock have been in 1953, when the Clock was set to two minutes until midnight after the U.S. and the Soviet Union began testing hydrogen bombs, and in 2018, following the failure of world leaders to address tensions relating to nuclear weapons and climate change issues.

Disarmament 

Nuclear disarmament refers to both the act of reducing or eliminating nuclear weapons and to the end state of a nuclear-free world, in which nuclear weapons are eliminated.

Beginning with the 1963 Partial Test Ban Treaty and continuing through the 1996 Comprehensive Nuclear-Test-Ban Treaty, there have been many treaties to limit or reduce nuclear weapons testing and stockpiles. The 1968 Nuclear Non-Proliferation Treaty has as one of its explicit conditions that all signatories must "pursue negotiations in good faith" towards the long-term goal of "complete disarmament". The nuclear-weapon states have largely treated that aspect of the agreement as "decorative" and without force.

Only one country—South Africa—has ever fully renounced nuclear weapons they had independently developed. The former Soviet republics of Belarus, Kazakhstan, and Ukraine returned Soviet nuclear arms stationed in their countries to Russia after the collapse of the USSR.

Proponents of nuclear disarmament say that it would lessen the probability of nuclear war, especially accidentally. Critics of nuclear disarmament say that it would undermine the present nuclear peace and deterrence and would lead to increased global instability. Various American elder statesmen, who were in office during the Cold War period, have been advocating the elimination of nuclear weapons. These officials include Henry Kissinger, George Shultz, Sam Nunn, and William Perry. In January 2010, Lawrence M. Krauss stated that "no issue carries more importance to the long-term health and security of humanity than the effort to reduce, and perhaps one day, rid the world of nuclear weapons".

In January 1986, Soviet leader Mikhail Gorbachev publicly proposed a three-stage program for abolishing the world's nuclear weapons by the end of the 20th century. In the years after the end of the Cold War, there have been numerous campaigns to urge the abolition of nuclear weapons, such as that organized by the Global Zero movement, and the goal of a "world without nuclear weapons" was advocated by United States President Barack Obama in an April 2009 speech in Prague. A CNN poll from April 2010 indicated that the American public was nearly evenly split on the issue.

Some analysts have argued that nuclear weapons have made the world relatively safer, with peace through deterrence and through the stability–instability paradox, including in south Asia. Kenneth Waltz has argued that nuclear weapons have helped keep an uneasy peace, and further nuclear weapon proliferation might even help avoid the large scale conventional wars that were so common before their invention at the end of World War II. But former Secretary Henry Kissinger says there is a new danger, which cannot be addressed by deterrence: "The classical notion of deterrence was that there was some consequences before which aggressors and evildoers would recoil. In a world of suicide bombers, that calculation doesn’t operate in any comparable way". George Shultz has said, "If you think of the people who are doing suicide attacks, and people like that get a nuclear weapon, they are almost by definition not deterrable".

As of early 2019, more than 90% of world's 13,865 nuclear weapons were owned by Russia and the United States.

United Nations 

The UN Office for Disarmament Affairs (UNODA) is a department of the United Nations Secretariat established in January 1998 as part of the United Nations Secretary-General Kofi Annan's plan to reform the UN as presented in his report to the General Assembly in July 1997.

Its goal is to promote nuclear disarmament and non-proliferation and the strengthening of the disarmament regimes in respect to other weapons of mass destruction, chemical and biological weapons. It also promotes disarmament efforts in the area of conventional weapons, especially land mines and small arms, which are often the weapons of choice in contemporary conflicts.

Controversy

Ethics 

Even before the first nuclear weapons had been developed, scientists involved with the Manhattan Project were divided over the use of the weapon. The role of the two atomic bombings of the country in Japan's surrender and the U.S.'s ethical justification for them has been the subject of scholarly and popular debate for decades. The question of whether nations should have nuclear weapons, or test them, has been continually and nearly universally controversial.

Notable nuclear weapons accidents 

 August 21, 1945: While conducting experiments on a plutonium-gallium core at Los Alamos National Laboratory, physicist Harry Daghlian received a lethal dose of radiation when an error caused it to enter prompt criticality. He died 25 days later, on September 15, 1945, from radiation poisoning.
 May 21, 1946: While conducting further experiments on the same core at Los Alamos National Laboratory, physicist Louis Slotin accidentally caused the core to become briefly supercritical. He received a lethal dose of gamma and neutron radiation, and died nine days later on May 30, 1946. After the death of Daghlian and Slotin, the mass became known as the "demon core." It was ultimately used to construct a bomb for use on the Nevada Test Range.
 February 13, 1950: a Convair B-36B crashed in northern British Columbia after jettisoning a Mark IV atomic bomb. This was the first such nuclear weapon loss in history. The accident was designated a "Broken Arrow"—an accident involving a nuclear weapon but which does not present a risk of war. Experts believe that up to 50 nuclear weapons were lost during the Cold War.
 May 22, 1957: a  Mark-17 hydrogen bomb accidentally fell from a bomber near Albuquerque, New Mexico. The detonation of the device's conventional explosives destroyed it on impact and formed a crater  in diameter on land owned by the University of New Mexico. According to a researcher at the Natural Resources Defense Council, it was one of the most powerful bombs made to date.
 June 7, 1960: the 1960 Fort Dix IM-99 accident destroyed a Boeing CIM-10 Bomarc nuclear missile and shelter and contaminated the BOMARC Missile Accident Site in New Jersey.
 January 24, 1961: the 1961 Goldsboro B-52 crash occurred near Goldsboro, North Carolina. A Boeing B-52 Stratofortress carrying two Mark 39 nuclear bombs broke up in mid-air, dropping its nuclear payload in the process.
 1965 Philippine Sea A-4 crash, where a Skyhawk attack aircraft with a nuclear weapon fell into the sea. The pilot, the aircraft, and the B43 nuclear bomb were never recovered. It was not until 1989 that the Pentagon revealed the loss of the one-megaton bomb.
 January 17, 1966: the 1966 Palomares B-52 crash occurred when a B-52G bomber of the USAF collided with a KC-135 tanker during mid-air refuelling off the coast of Spain. The KC-135 was completely destroyed when its fuel load ignited, killing all four crew members. The B-52G broke apart, killing three of the seven crew members aboard. Of the four Mk28 type hydrogen bombs the B-52G carried, three were found on land near Almería, Spain. The non-nuclear explosives in two of the weapons detonated upon impact with the ground, resulting in the contamination of a  (0.78 square mile) area by radioactive plutonium. The fourth, which fell into the Mediterranean Sea, was recovered intact after a 2-month-long search.
 January 21, 1968: the 1968 Thule Air Base B-52 crash involved a United States Air Force (USAF) B-52 bomber. The aircraft was carrying four hydrogen bombs when a cabin fire forced the crew to abandon the aircraft. Six crew members ejected safely, but one who did not have an ejection seat was killed while trying to bail out. The bomber crashed onto sea ice in Greenland, causing the nuclear payload to rupture and disperse, which resulted in widespread radioactive contamination. One of the bombs remains lost.
 September 18–19, 1980: the Damascus Accident, occurred in Damascus, Arkansas, where a Titan missile equipped with a nuclear warhead exploded. The accident was caused by a maintenance man who dropped a socket from a socket wrench down an  shaft, puncturing a fuel tank on the rocket. Leaking fuel resulted in a hypergolic fuel explosion, jettisoning the W-53 warhead beyond the launch site.

Nuclear testing and fallout 
 

Over 500 atmospheric nuclear weapons tests were conducted at various sites around the world from 1945 to 1980. Radioactive fallout from nuclear weapons testing was first drawn to public attention in 1954 when the Castle Bravo hydrogen bomb test at the Pacific Proving Grounds contaminated the crew and catch of the Japanese fishing boat Lucky Dragon. One of the fishermen died in Japan seven months later, and the fear of contaminated tuna led to a temporary boycotting of the popular staple in Japan. The incident caused widespread concern around the world, especially regarding the effects of nuclear fallout and atmospheric nuclear testing, and "provided a decisive impetus for the emergence of the anti-nuclear weapons movement in many countries".

As public awareness and concern mounted over the possible health hazards associated with exposure to the nuclear fallout, various studies were done to assess the extent of the hazard. A Centers for Disease Control and Prevention/ National Cancer Institute study claims that fallout from atmospheric nuclear tests would lead to perhaps 11,000 excess deaths among people alive during atmospheric testing in the United States from all forms of cancer, including leukemia, from 1951 to well into the 21st century.
, the U.S. is the only nation that compensates nuclear test victims. Since the Radiation Exposure Compensation Act of 1990, more than $1.38 billion in compensation has been approved. The money is going to people who took part in the tests, notably at the Nevada Test Site, and to others exposed to the radiation.

In addition, leakage of byproducts of nuclear weapon production into groundwater has been an ongoing issue, particularly at the Hanford site.

Effects of nuclear explosions

Effects of nuclear explosions on human health 

Some scientists estimate that a nuclear war with 100 Hiroshima-size nuclear explosions on cities could cost the lives of tens of millions of people from long-term climatic effects alone. The climatology hypothesis is that if each city firestorms, a great deal of soot could be thrown up into the atmosphere which could blanket the earth, cutting out sunlight for years on end, causing the disruption of food chains, in what is termed a nuclear winter.

People near the Hiroshima explosion and who managed to survive the explosion subsequently suffered a variety of medical effects:
 Initial stage—the first 1–9 weeks, in which are the greatest number of deaths, with 90% due to thermal injury and/or blast effects and 10% due to super-lethal radiation exposure.
 Intermediate stage—from 10 to 12 weeks. The deaths in this period are from ionizing radiation in the median lethal range – LD50
 Late period—lasting from 13 to 20 weeks. This period has some improvement in survivors' condition.
 Delayed period—from 20+ weeks. Characterized by numerous complications, mostly related to healing of thermal and mechanical injuries, and if the individual was exposed to a few hundred to a thousand millisieverts of radiation, it is coupled with infertility, sub-fertility and blood disorders. Furthermore, ionizing radiation above a dose of around 50–100 millisievert exposure has been shown to statistically begin increasing one's chance of dying of cancer sometime in their lifetime over the normal unexposed rate of ~25%, in the long term, a heightened rate of cancer, proportional to the dose received, would begin to be observed after ~5+ years, with lesser problems such as eye cataracts and other more minor effects in other organs and tissue also being observed over the long term.

Fallout exposure—depending on if further afield individuals shelter in place or evacuate perpendicular to the direction of the wind, and therefore avoid contact with the fallout plume, and stay there for the days and weeks after the nuclear explosion, their exposure to fallout, and therefore their total dose, will vary. With those who do shelter in place, and or evacuate, experiencing a total dose that would be negligible in comparison to someone who just went about their life as normal.

Staying indoors until after the most hazardous fallout isotope, I-131 decays away to 0.1% of its initial quantity after ten half-lifes—which is represented by 80 days in I-131s case, would make the difference between likely contracting Thyroid cancer or escaping completely from this substance depending on the actions of the individual.

Effects of nuclear war 

Nuclear war could yield unprecedented human death tolls and habitat destruction. Detonating large numbers of nuclear weapons would have an immediate, short term and long-term effects on the climate, potentially causing cold weather known as a "nuclear winter". In 1982, Brian Martin estimated that a US–Soviet nuclear exchange might kill 400–450 million directly, mostly in the United States, Europe and Russia, and maybe several hundred million more through follow-up consequences in those same areas. Many scholars have posited that a global thermonuclear war with Cold War-era stockpiles, or even with the current smaller stockpiles, may lead to the extinction of the human race. The International Physicians for the Prevention of Nuclear War believe that nuclear war could indirectly contribute to human extinction via secondary effects, including environmental consequences, societal breakdown, and economic collapse. It has been estimated that a relatively small-scale nuclear exchange between India and Pakistan involving 100 Hiroshima yield (15 kilotons) weapons, could cause a nuclear winter and kill more than a billion people. 

According to a peer-reviewed study published in the journal Nature Food in August 2022, a full-scale nuclear war between the U.S. and Russia would directly kill 360 million people and more than 5 billion people would die from starvation. More than 2 billion people could die from a smaller-scale nuclear war between India and Pakistan.

Public opposition 

Peace movements emerged in Japan and in 1954 they converged to form a unified "Japan Council against Atomic and Hydrogen Bombs." Japanese opposition to nuclear weapons tests in the Pacific Ocean was widespread, and "an estimated 35 million signatures were collected on petitions calling for bans on nuclear weapons".

In the United Kingdom, the first Aldermaston March organised by the Campaign for Nuclear Disarmament(CND) took place at Easter 1958, when, according to the CND, several thousand people marched for four days from Trafalgar Square, London, to the Atomic Weapons Research Establishment close to Aldermaston in Berkshire, England, to demonstrate their opposition to nuclear weapons. The Aldermaston marches continued into the late 1960s when tens of thousands of people took part in the four-day marches.

In 1959, a letter in the Bulletin of the Atomic Scientists was the start of a successful campaign to stop the Atomic Energy Commission dumping radioactive waste in the sea 19 kilometres from Boston. In 1962, Linus Pauling won the Nobel Peace Prize for his work to stop the atmospheric testing of nuclear weapons, and the "Ban the Bomb" movement spread.

In 1963, many countries ratified the Partial Test Ban Treaty prohibiting atmospheric nuclear testing. Radioactive fallout became less of an issue and the anti-nuclear weapons movement went into decline for some years. A resurgence of interest occurred amid European and American fears of nuclear war in the 1980s.

Costs and technology spin-offs 

According to an audit by the Brookings Institution, between 1940 and 1996, the U.S. spent $ in present-day terms on nuclear weapons programs. 57% of which was spent on building nuclear weapons delivery systems. 6.3% of the total, $ in present-day terms, was spent on environmental remediation and nuclear waste management, for example cleaning up the Hanford site, and 7% of the total, $ was spent on making nuclear weapons themselves.

Non-weapons uses 

Peaceful nuclear explosions are nuclear explosions conducted for non-military purposes, such as activities related to economic development including the creation of canals. During the 1960s and 1970s, both the United States and the Soviet Union conducted a number of PNEs. Six of the explosions by the Soviet Union are considered to have been of an applied nature, not just tests.

The United States and the Soviet Union later halted their programs. Definitions and limits are covered in the Peaceful Nuclear Explosions Treaty of 1976. The stalled Comprehensive Nuclear-Test-Ban Treaty of 1996 would prohibit all nuclear explosions, regardless of whether they are for peaceful purposes or not.

History of development

See also 

 Cobalt bomb
 Cosmic bomb (phrase)
 Cuban Missile Crisis
 Dirty bomb
 Induced gamma emission
 List of states with nuclear weapons
 List of nuclear close calls
 List of nuclear weapons
 Nth Country Experiment
 Nuclear blackout
 Nuclear bunker buster
 Nuclear holocaust
 Nuclear weapons of the United Kingdom
 Nuclear weapons in popular culture
 Nuclear weapons of the United States
 OPANAL (Agency for the Prohibition of Nuclear Weapons in Latin America and the Caribbean)
 Three Non-Nuclear Principles of Japan

References

Notes
Explanatory Notes

Citations

Bibliography

 Bethe, Hans Albrecht. The Road from Los Alamos. New York: Simon and Schuster, 1991. 
 DeVolpi, Alexander, Minkov, Vladimir E., Simonenko, Vadim A., and Stanford, George S. Nuclear Shadowboxing: Contemporary Threats from Cold War Weaponry. Fidlar Doubleday, 2004 (Two volumes, both accessible on Google Book Search) (Content of both volumes is now available in the 2009 trilogy by Alexander DeVolpi: Nuclear Insights: The Cold War Legacy)
 Glasstone, Samuel and Dolan, Philip J. The Effects of Nuclear Weapons (third edition). Washington, D.C.: U.S. Government Printing Office, 1977. Available online (PDF).
 NATO Handbook on the Medical Aspects of NBC Defensive Operations (Part I – Nuclear). Departments of the Army, Navy, and Air Force: Washington, D.C., 1996
 Hansen, Chuck. U.S. Nuclear Weapons: The Secret History. Arlington, TX: Aerofax, 1988
 Hansen, Chuck, "Swords of Armageddon: U.S. nuclear weapons development since 1945" (CD-ROM & download available). PDF. 2,600 pages, Sunnyvale, California, Chucklea Publications, 1995, 2007.  (2nd Ed.)
 Holloway, David. Stalin and the Bomb. New Haven: Yale University Press, 1994. 
 The Manhattan Engineer District, "The Atomic Bombings of Hiroshima and Nagasaki" (1946)
  Jean-Hugues Oppel, Réveillez le président, Éditions Payot et rivages, 2007. The book is a fiction about the nuclear weapons of France; the book also contains about ten chapters on true historical incidents involving nuclear weapons and strategy.
 Smyth, Henry DeWolf. Atomic Energy for Military Purposes. Princeton, NJ: Princeton University Press, 1945. (Smyth Reportthe first declassified report by the US government on nuclear weapons)
 The Effects of Nuclear War. Office of Technology Assessment, May 1979.
 Rhodes, Richard. Dark Sun: The Making of the Hydrogen Bomb. New York: Simon and Schuster, 1995. 
 Rhodes, Richard. The Making of the Atomic Bomb. New York: Simon and Schuster, 1986 
 Shultz, George P. and Goodby, James E. The War that Must Never be Fought, Hoover Press, 2015, .
 Weart, Spencer R. Nuclear Fear: A History of Images. Cambridge, Massachusetts: Harvard University Press, 1988. 
 Weart, Spencer R. The Rise of Nuclear Fear. Cambridge, Massachusetts: Harvard University Press, 2012.

Further reading

 Laura Grego and David Wright, "Broken Shield: Missiles designed to destroy incoming nuclear warheads fail frequently in tests and could increase global risk of mass destruction", Scientific American, vol. 320, no. no. 6 (June 2019), pp. 62–67. "Current U.S. missile defense plans are being driven largely by technology, politics and fear. Missile defenses will not allow us to escape our vulnerability to nuclear weapons. Instead large-scale developments will create barriers to taking real steps toward reducing nuclear risks—by blocking further cuts in nuclear arsenals and potentially spurring new deployments." (p. 67.)
 Michael T. Klare, "Missile Mania: The death of the INF [Intermediate-Range Nuclear Forces] Treaty [of 1987] has escalated the arms race", The Nation, vol. 309, no. 6 (September 23, 2019), p. 4.
 Moniz, Ernest J., and Sam Nunn, "The Return of Doomsday: The New Nuclear Arms Race – and How Washington and Moscow Can Stop It", Foreign Affairs, vol. 98, no. 5 (September / October 2019), pp. 150–161. Former U.S. Secretary of Energy Ernest Moniz and former U.S. Senator Sam Nunn write that "the old [strategic] equilibrium" between the United States and Russia has been "destabilized" by "clashing national interests, insufficient dialogue, eroding arms control structures, advanced missile systems, and new cyberweapons... Unless Washington and Moscow confront these problems now, a major international conflict or nuclear escalation is disturbingly plausible—perhaps even likely." (p. 161.)
 Thomas Powers, "The Nuclear Worrier" (review of Daniel Ellsberg, The Doomsday Machine: Confessions of a Nuclear War Planner, New York, Bloomsbury, 2017, 420 pp.), The New York Review of Books, vol. LXV, no. 1 (January 18, 2018), pp. 13–15.
 Eric Schlosser, Command and Control: Nuclear Weapons, the Damascus Accident, and the Illusion of Safety, Penguin Press, 2013, . The book became the basis for a 2-hour 2017 PBS American Experience episode, likewise titled "Command and Control". Nuclear weapons continue to be equally hazardous to their owners as to their potential targets. Under the 1970 Treaty on the Non-Proliferation of Nuclear Weapons, nuclear-weapon states are obliged to work toward the elimination of nuclear weapons.
 Tom Stevenson, "A Tiny Sun" (review of Fred Kaplan, The Bomb: Presidents, Generals, and the Secret History of Nuclear War, Simon and Schuster, 2021,  384 pp.; and Keir A. Lieber and Daryl G. Press, The Myth of the Nuclear Revolution: Power Politics in the Atomic Age, Cornell, 2020, 180 pp.), London Review of Books, vol. 44, no. 4 (24 February 2022), pp. 29–32. "Nuclear strategists systematically underestimate the chances of nuclear accident... [T]here have been too many close calls for accidental use to be discounted." (p. 32.)
 David Wright and Cameron Tracy, "Over-hyped: Physics dictates that hypersonic weapons cannot live up to the grand promises made on their behalf", Scientific American, vol. 325, no. 2 (August 2021), pp. 64–71. "Failure to fully assess [the potential benefits and costs of hypersonic weapons] is a recipe for wasteful spending and increased global risk." (p. 71.)

External links 

 Nuclear Weapon Archive from Carey Sublette is a reliable source of information and has links to other sources and an informative FAQ.
 The Federation of American Scientists provide solid information on weapons of mass destruction, including nuclear weapons and their effects
 Alsos Digital Library for Nuclear Issues – contains many resources related to nuclear weapons, including a historical and technical overview and searchable bibliography of web and print resources.
 Video archive of US, Soviet, UK, Chinese and French Nuclear Weapon Testing at sonicbomb.com
 The National Museum of Nuclear Science & History (United States) – located in Albuquerque, New Mexico; a Smithsonian Affiliate Museum
 Nuclear Emergency and Radiation Resources
 The Manhattan Project: Making the Atomic Bomb at AtomicArchive.com
 Los Alamos National Laboratory: History (U.S. nuclear history)
 Race for the Superbomb, PBS website on the history of the H-bomb
 Recordings of recollections of the victims of Hiroshima and Nagasaki
 The Woodrow Wilson Center's Nuclear Proliferation International History Project or NPIHP is a global network of individuals and institutions engaged in the study of international nuclear history through archival documents, oral history interviews and other empirical sources.
 NUKEMAP3D – a 3D nuclear weapons effects simulator powered by Google Maps.

 
Weapons and ammunition introduced in 1945
American inventions
Articles containing video clips
Bombs
Nuclear bombs